Bottesford Preceptory was sited at Bottesford, just to the south of Scunthorpe, in Lindsey, England. It was on low-lying land, near the Bottesford Beck, about 3 miles (5 km) to the west of the escarpment of the Lincoln Cliff limestone upland, and about the same distance to the east of the River Trent. A preceptory was a community of the Knights Templar who lived on one of that order's estates in the charge of its preceptor. A preceptory also referred to the estate and its buildings. The present Bottesford Manor is believed to have been the gatehouse to the preceptory.

Templars Bath, a spring in the field behind Bottesford Manor, is now hardly discernible, being simply a gathering of stones. The bath has been attributed to the Romans but others believe it was a dipping bath or well used by the Templar workers. It was once used as a "magic" health-giving spring. Travellers would drink its waters and leave cloth offerings (a "rag well"). This healing property was probably associated with its position near a Templar hospital. The only distinctive Templar artefact found here was an ancient gravestone with a large cross upon it. It was covering a body buried in a grave that had been placed at the angle formed by the north wall of the chancel and the east wall of the north transept, though this description is inconsistent with a normal Templar round church.

Archaeologists excavated the Templar fields nearby in 1983, but little was found and the land was back-filled.

See also other Lincolnshire  Templar Preceptories
Aslackby Preceptory, Kesteven
Eagle, Kesteven
Temple Bruer Preceptory
Witham Preceptory, Kesteven
Willoughton Preceptory, Lindsey

Lincolnshire Templar Camera and Granges
Bottesford, Lindsey . Cell of Willougton()
Temple Belwood, Belton, North Lincolnshire
Grantham Angel and Royal
Gainsborough, Lincolnshire
Great Limber, Lindsey
Horkstow, Lindsey Cell of Willoughton.
Mere, Branston and Mere. Probably a grange of Willoughton.

References 

History of Lincolnshire
Buildings and structures in Lincolnshire
Archaeological sites in Lincolnshire
Knights Templar
Monasteries in Lincolnshire